David Meerman Scott is an American online marketing strategist and author of several books on marketing, including The New Rules of Marketing and PR.

Education and career
Scott graduated from Kenyon College in 1983 with a BA in economics. After early jobs as a clerk on several Wall Street bond trading desks, he worked in the online news and information business from 1985 to 2002, holding executive positions in an electronic information division of Knight-Ridder, from 1989 to 1995.

Scott moved to the Boston area in 1995 and joined Desktop Data, which became NewsEdge Corporation, ultimately holding the position of vice president of marketing until the business was sold to Thomson Corporation in 2002. Thomson Corporation terminated his employment after acquiring NewsEdge, so he started his own business as a marketing strategist.

Content marketing strategist  

Scott's assertion is that marketing and public relations is vastly different on the Web than in mainstream media. He says that the old rules of mainstream media are about controlling a message and getting the message into the public domain by buying expensive advertising or begging the media to write about you. He says that the rules of marketing and PR on the Web are completely different. Instead of buying or begging your way in, Scott says anybody can earn attention by "publishing their way in" using the tools of social media such as, blogs, podcasts, online news releases, online video, viral marketing, and online media. He believes that, with few exceptions, marketers gain the best return on their investment in content creation when they choose "ungated" publication.

Writing for Forbes, Nick Morgan notes that "David is one of those select few people who saw and understood the social media phenomenon as it began..."

Books 

Scott is the author of several books, as detailed below.

The New Rules of Marketing and PR
Scott initially released the book as a free, ungated e-book. It was subsequently published as a traditional printed book.

Scott summarizes the book's content marketing theme as "You are what you publish online." The content should be about what audience cares about, not directly about the product itself. "Nobody cares about your product but you," Scott says.

Writing for The New York Times Magazine, Virginia Heffernan recommended the book "For practical P.R. in the age of Twitter,..." In an interview on Marketing Update, Scott stated that besides the fast pace of change in marketing, another motivation for the new edition was that the book had been incorporated into the curriculum of many universities. As a result, he plans to publish a new edition in summer every other year. The second edition won praise in The New York Times and Computerworld reviews. The first edition was featured in the BusinessWeek Best Seller List. John P. David describes the book as being the preeminent text on public relations.

Scott believes that the ideas in the book apply not only in commerce but also political campaigning, referencing in particular the 2016 US Presidential campaign of Donald Trump. They can even be used to humanize otherwise faceless government organizations like the CIA.

Newsjacking
Writing about Newsjacking;How to inject your ideas into a breaking news story and generate tons of media coverage for Forbes Magazine, Nick Morgan notes that Scott and his publisher, Wiley, "point the way forward" by publishing this book only in electronic formats. He describes [newsjacking] as the art and science of injecting your ideas into a breaking news. Kristi Hedges, also writing for Forbes, observes that Scott 'answers [the question] "Should I be on Twitter?" once and for all', citing its instantaneous nature and widespread use by journalists. Writing for Fast Company, Wendy Marx cautions those who might be tempted to take the idea too far, "Don't ... spam reporters ... That will only backfire". Tracey Boudine criticizes the term because it is a mashup of news and hijack and thus "implies you’re doing something you’re not supposed to" and goes on to say there is no need for a buzzword and that PR professions should use the criterion "Does this elevate?"   

The word was added to the Oxford English Dictionary in 2017 ("the practice of taking advantage of current events or news stories in such a way as to promote or advertise one's product or brand") and appeared as one of the eight neologisms on their Word of the Year shortlist. They credit Scott for this contemporary usage.

Real-Time Marketing and PR
Real-Time Marketing and PR:How to Instantly Engage Your Market, Connect With Your Customers, and Create Products that Grow Your Business Now draws on Scott's earlier career as an up-to-the-second Wall Street trader, this book highlights how the timely creation of heart felt content can be more important than polished pieces with their long lead times. Examples include the Dave Carroll United Breaks Guitars phenomenon. Writing in BtoB Magazine, Christopher Hosford quotes Scott as saying, "The idea of real-time communication ... is the most interesting thing going on in b2b marketing right now".

Marketing Lessons from the Grateful Dead

Marketing Lessons from the Grateful Dead: What Every Business Can Learn from the Most Iconic Band in History was coauthored with Brian Halligan, CEO of HubSpot. Scott Kirsner, reviewing the book in the Boston Globe, mentions that the authors say they were inspired in part by an article in the Atlantic by Joshua Green. Rather than record sales, the band generated the majority of its revenues from live performances and associated merchandise sales. While most bands tried to prevent bootleg recordings, The Grateful Dead actually encouraged fans to record their concerts and share them with their network, building a passionate community of fans called ‘Deadheads.’

Marketing the Moon
Reviewing Marketing the Moon:The Selling of the Apollo Lunar Program for The Boston Globe, Carolyn Y. Johnson writes that the book documents NASA's success in placing the Apollo mission at front-of-mind of ordinary people and The Wall Street Journal found the "decadelong surge of public interest in all things lunar" remarkable. Reviewing the book for The New Yorker magazine, Joshua Rothman contrasts the usual "derring-do" presentation of the Apollo program by observing: "Scott and Jurek see it as ... an attempt to convince America, and the world, of its own competence, intelligence, and courage." In an essay based on the coverage of astronaut celebrity in their book, Scott and Jurek link it to that of aviation predecessors such as Charles Lindbergh. A particularly important facet of the Apollo mission was live television broadcast of the landing. Scott calls this "one of the best decisions ever made." Besides NASA's own PR tem, many of the Apollo subcontractors invested in innovative press kits. 
The authors critique NASA for assuming that initial levels of public interest would remain high, and not developing a long-term strategy to maintain public engagement and support.
The book's foreword is by Captain Eugene Cernan, the twelfth and (so far) last man to walk on the moon. Scott and co-author Richard Jurek were consulting producers on the documentary film American Experience: Chasing The Moon by Robert Stone, which was based on the book
and which aired on PBS in July 2019 for the 50th anniversary of Apollo 11.

The New Rules of Sales and Service
Dan Schawbel interviewed the author about The New Rules of Sales and Service: How to Use Agile Selling, Real-Time Customer Engagement, Big Data, Content, and Storytelling to Grow Your Business for Forbes magazine and notes that instant communications wasn't instant, ease of researching products online, and ease of voicing a complaint about poor service have led to these new rules. Scott published a free summary of the main points of the book on SlideShare.

Fanocracy: Turning Fans into Customers and Customers into Fans
In January 2020, Scott published Fanocracy: Turning Fans into Customers and Customers into Fans co-authored with his daughter, Reiko Scott. It explains how to benefit from the trend where savvy companies and non-profits attract not just customers but fans who indirectly promote the product better than direct marketing from the company itself can. It was listed on the Wall Street Journal Best Selling Books list in the Hardcover Business category and on Publishers Weekly This Week's Bestsellers list. Reiko Scott has a background in neuroscience and points out that the brain is wired such that human connection, such as fandom, depends on physical closeness.

Other  books
In addition Scott has published:
 World Wide Rave (2009).  
 Tuned In (2008)
 Cashing In With Content (2005)
 Eyeball Wars: A Novel of Dot-com Intrigue (2001)

Personal life
Scott is married to Yukari Watanabe Scott. They have one daughter, Reiko Scott, with whom Scott co-authored Fanocracy: Turning Fans into Customers and Customers into Fans.

Notes

External links

Blog
Real-Time Marketing & PR on-demand webinar

Living people
American business writers
American business theorists
Business speakers
Place of birth missing (living people)
Marketing speakers
Kenyon College alumni
1961 births